Vovinam at the 2009 Asian Indoor Games was held in Ho Chi Minh City, Vietnam from October 31 to November 2. All events of this sport took place in Quân Khu 7 Gymnasium.

Medalists

Performance

Men

Women

Mixed

Fighting

Men

Women

Medal table

Results

Performance

Men

Five-gate form
1 November

Dual machete form
2 November

Attack by leg
31 October

Multi-weapon
31 October

Women

Dragon-tiger form
1 November

Dual sword form
2 November

Mixed

Female self-defense
31 October

Multi-weapon
31 October

Fighting

Men

55 kg
31 October

60 kg
1 November

65 kg
2 November

70 kg
2 November

Women

50 kg
1 November

55 kg
31 October

References 
 Official website

2009 Asian Indoor Games events